Ten Minutes to Live is a 1932 American film directed by Oscar Micheaux and starring Lawrence Chenault, A. B. DeComathiere, Laura Bowman, Willor Lee Guilford, and Tressie Mitchell. One of the characters is deaf and much of the dialogue was dubbed offscreen. The film is part of the collection of the Museum of Modern Art.

Plot summary 
A producer offers a nightclub singer a role in his latest film, but all he really wants to do is have sex with her. She knows, but accepts anyway. Meanwhile, a patron at the club gets a note saying that she will soon get another note, and that she will be killed ten minutes after that.

Cast 
Lawrence Chenault as Gary Martin
A. B. DeComathiere as Anthony
Laura Bowman as Ida Morton
Willor Lee Guilford as Letha Watkins
Tressie Mitchell as Charlotte Evans
Mabel Garrett as Ida Groves
Carl Mahon as Martin
Galle De Gaston as Galle
George Williams as George
Lorenzo Tucker as The Godfather
William A. Clayton Jr. as Morvis
Donald Heywood as Master of Ceremonies
Arnold Wiley as Tap Dancer

Soundtrack

References

External links 

1932 films
American musical drama films
1930s musical drama films
American mystery films
American black-and-white films
Films directed by Oscar Micheaux
1930s mystery films
Race films
1932 drama films
1930s English-language films
1930s American films